= North Korea in the Korean War =

The Korean War started when North Korea invaded South Korea, and ended on July 27, 1953, with the armistice creating the well-known Korean Demilitarized Zone.

== Before the War ==
In August 1945, two young aides at the State Department divided the Korean peninsula in half along the 38th parallel. The Soviet Union occupied the area north of the line and the United States occupied the area to its south.

== Beginning ==
On June 25, 1950, the Korean War began when some 75,000 soldiers from the North Korean People's Army poured across the 38th parallel, the boundary between the Soviet-backed Democratic People's Republic of Korea to the north and the pro-Western Republic of Korea to the south. This invasion was the first military action of the Cold War. Tactics were based on Soviet doctrine which emphasised rapid advances spearheaded by armoured and infantry assaults. The quality and power of the KPA's initial invasion resulted in its opponents being forced back to the southern tip of the Korean peninsula. By July, American troops had entered the war on South Korea's behalf. As far as American officials were concerned, it was a war against the forces of international communism itself. After some early back-and-forth across the 38th parallel, the fighting stalled and casualties mounted with nothing to show for them. Meanwhile, American officials worked anxiously to fashion some sort of armistice with the North Koreans. The alternative, they feared, would be a wider war with Russia and China–or even, as some warned, World War III. By the end of the decade, two new states had formed on the peninsula. In the south, the anti-communist dictator Syngman Rhee (1875–1965) enjoyed the reluctant support of the American government; in the north, the communist dictator Kim Il Sung (1912–1994) enjoyed the slightly more enthusiastic support of the Soviets. Neither dictator was content to remain on his side of the 38th parallel, however, and border skirmishes were common. Even so, the North Korean invasion came as an alarming surprise to American officials. As far as they were concerned, this was not simply a border dispute between two unstable dictatorships on the other side of the globe. Instead, many feared it was the first step in a communist campaign to take over the world. For this reason, nonintervention was not considered an option by many top decision makers.

As the North Korean army pushed into Seoul, the South Korean capital, the United States readied its troops for a war against communism itself. At first, the war was a defensive one–a war to get the communists out of South Korea–and it went badly for the Allies. The North Korean army was well-disciplined, well-trained and well-equipped; Rhee's forces, by contrast, were frightened, confused, and seemed inclined to flee the battlefield at any provocation. Also, it was one of the hottest and driest summers on record, and desperately thirsty American soldiers were often forced to drink water from rice paddies that had been fertilized with human waste. As a result, dangerous intestinal diseases and other illnesses were a constant threat. By the end of the summer, President Truman and General Douglas MacArthur (1880–1964), the commander in charge of the Asian theater, had decided on a new set of war aims. Now, for the Allies, the Korean War was an offensive one: It was a war to "liberate" the North from the communists.

Initially, this new strategy was a success. An amphibious assault at Inchon pushed the North Koreans out of Seoul and back to their side of the 38th parallel. But as American troops crossed the boundary and headed north toward the Yalu River, the border between North Korea and Communist China, the Chinese started to worry about protecting themselves from what they called "armed aggression against Chinese territory." Chinese leader Mao Zedong (1893–1976) sent troops to North Korea and warned the United States to keep away from the Yalu boundary unless it wanted full-scale war.

== Aftermath ==
Finally, in July 1953, the Korean War came to an end. Truman and his new military commanders started peace talks at Panmunjom. Still, the fighting continued along the 38th parallel as negotiations were stalled. Both sides were willing to accept a ceasefire that maintained the 38th parallel boundary, but they could not agree on whether prisoners of war should be forcibly "repatriated." Finally, after around more than two years of negotiations, the adversaries signed an armistice on July 27, 1953. The agreement drew a new boundary near the 38th parallel that gave South Korea an extra 3,900 square kilometres (1,500 square miles) of territory; and created a 3-kilometre-wide (2-mile) "demilitarized zone" that still exists today in the North and South Korean borders, in the bottom and top, respectively.

== Casualties ==
The Korean War was relatively short but exceptionally bloody compared to other wars. Nearly 3 million people died. More than half of these, about 10 percent of Korea's pre-war population, were civilians. This rate of civilian casualties was higher than in World War II and the Vietnam War. Nearly 10,000 North and South Korean soldiers were also killed in battle before the war even began. North Korean casualties amount at around 600,000 civilians and 406,000 soldiers.

- Civilians

Category	Civilians
Killed	282,000
Missing	796,000
Conscripted	600,000
Total	1,678,000

== In media and popular culture ==
Unlike World War II and Vietnam, the Korean War did not get much media attention in the United States. The most famous representation of the war in popular culture is the television series M*A*S*H, which was set in a field hospital in South Korea. The series ran from 1972 until 1983, and its final episode was the most watched in television history.
